The Absa Cape Epic, founded by Kevin Vermaak and also known as the Cape Epic, is an annual mountain bike stage race held in the Western Cape, South Africa. First staged in 2004, it has been accredited as hors catégorie (beyond categorization) by the Union Cycliste Internationale.
 
Professional mountain bikers from around the world encompassing up to 650 teams compete teams of two. To qualify for a finish, teams have to stay together for the duration of the race. The race is also open to amateurs, who enter a lottery in order to gain a slot. The times taken to finish each stage are aggregated to determine the overall winning team in each category at the end of the race. The course changes every year, but the race has always taken place in the Western Cape.

The race was acquired by Advance Publications, a US media company, as part of its acquisition of The Ironman Group in March 2020.

Origins
Kevin Vermaak founded the Absa Cape Epic in 2004 at a time when there were no similar events in South Africa and the sport of mountain biking was in its infancy in the country. Today, the Absa Cape Epic is routinely referred to as "the Tour de France of mountain biking". The growth of the Absa Cape Epic has been paralleled by an explosion in the popularity of mountain biking in South Africa, and there are now more than 50 stage races.
Vermaak, a Capetonian and UCT electrical engineering graduate, worked in IT in London in the early 2000s and, as a passionate mountain biker, took part in events across the world, including two mountain bike crossings of the Himalayas. He conceived the Absa Cape Epic while taking part in the La Ruta de los Conquistadores in Costa Rica in November, 2002. By February 2003 he was back in South Africa after eight years in London to establish the Cape Epic. Vermaak rode the Absa Cape Epic for the first time in 2016, and again in 2019.

Route
The route starts and finishes in the Western Cape, South Africa. It is redesigned every year. The route originally was a point-to-point race, beginning in Knysna and ending in the winelands of the Western Cape. This format changed in 2009, when riders spent multiple days in each stage location to ensure the route could fully explore the best mountain biking that the region had to offer.

Race concept
Two person team
All riders must enter as a two-person team. Initially the team concept was developed because stage racing often takes riders through some very remote areas, and having partners who are bound by the race rules to look after each other serves a safety function. Riders in a team must remain within 2 minutes of each other at all times during the race or face a one-hour penalty. This is enforced by means of timing mats places through the stage. After a third offence, the team is disqualified. Teams are expected to reach the finish line by the specified maximum stage time, team dynamics therefore are a major part of the race.

Categories and leader jerseys
All riders aim to win stages, but mostly they want to win in their category. There are five categories: Men, Women, Mixed, Masters and Grand Masters. The colors denoting the category leaders are: yellow – Men; orange – Women, green – Mixed (a woman and a man), blue – Masters (both riders must be 40 years or older on 31 December of the year of the race), purple – Grand Masters (both riders must be 50 years or older on 31 December of the year of the race). The category leaders competition is decided by totaling the time each team takes on the daily stages. The team with the lowest overall time at the end of each stage receives ceremonial leaders' jerseys and the right to start the next stage of the race in those jerseys.

Blue numbers boards
Any rider who does not complete a stage within the maximum stage time for the first time will be classified as a blue board rider. Blue board riders will be entitled to continue the race (they may start the following stage), but will not be classified as official race finishers. Should any blue board rider fail for the second time to finish a stage within the maximum stage time or fail to start a stage, he or she will not be allowed to continue the race.

Leopard Jersey
UCI licensed riders who lose their partners will be allowed to continue riding but without influencing the outcome of the race. They are required to ride in the Leopard Jersey. Riders in this jersey may not ride within the first 30 teams or interfere with the race or other categories such as the mixed or ladies teams. Any rider or team accepting mechanical or any other assistance from the outcast rider will be penalized. This will give the rider the opportunity to finish the race, be it unofficially, but still be part of the experience.

Internal technical and tactical support
It is allowed - any rider, including riders from the same sponsor (but not in the same 2-rider team) can provide technical assistance and equipment from his own bicycle to support another rider. Teams can also form alliances with other riders and teams, even if they are not of the same sponsor.

Pro-Am aspect of the race
Amateurs use the same chute, ride the same course and stay in the same race village as the UCI registered riders, which include world and national champions and Olympic medalists.

History

Timeline from 2002

Past Winners

Men

Women

Stage types
Recent editions of the Absa Cape Epic have started with a prologue followed by seven stages on the following seven days. The prologue is characteristically less than 30 km and held on a course that favours riders with technical skills. The stages normally range from between 80 km to 140 km. The longest stage in Absa Cape Epic history was the 146 km Stage 5 in 2008, which took riders from Swellendam to Bredasdorp.

Prologue
Marking the opening day of the race, this is a two-man team time trial, where teams usually leave at timed intervals. Riders use the prologue as an opportunity to be seeded in a faster group, ensuring a good position for the mass start the following day. The first ever prologue of the Absa Cape Epic was in Knysna in 2008. A sloping start ramp launches the team into motion after a countdown.

Mass and staggered start
In most stages of the race, teams start together, either in a mass start or in staggered, seeded group starts. As they roll out of the respective start towns, the teams are led by a vehicle, without racing. Once out of the neutral zone is the real start, setting riders on their way. The second member of the first team across the line wins. Riders in a group finish in the same time as the lead rider. Time bonuses for intermediate sprints have been offered in the past. Stage lengths usually vary between 60 km and 145 km. Long stages cause major shifts in the general classification and large time differences between teams. A maximum ride time is allotted for each day and teams must complete the stage within that time. If they arrive after their start group's maximum allotted time they will be listed as unofficial finishers.

Time trial
Some years, an individual time trial appears midway through raceweek, this is a two-man team time trial, where teams usually leave at timed intervals. Like the prologue, it's an all out effort. The distance varies but typically is around 30 km, which is regarded by the main field, who are not contending for overall victory, as an 'easy' day.

A brief history of the racing to date
2004
2004 saw Karl Platt team up with Namibian Mannie Heymans, one of the world's top marathoners at the time to win six out of the eight stages, with a 20-minute lead overall.

2005
In 2005, Olympic gold medalist and mountain biking legend Bart Brentjens partnered with Roel Paulissen to win the race.

2006
The Swiss team of Christoph Sauser and Silvio Bundi won this edition; previous winner Platt only managed 3rd, partnered with Carsten Bresser. This was to be the Absa Cape Epic's most convincing win yet, with Sauser and Bundi's 29min 08sec lead over Johannes Sickmuller and Christian Heule.

2007
Karl Platt formed a new team with Stefan Sahm, named the Bulls. They won the first stage in a tight race against Roel Paulissen and Jakob Fuglsang of Cannondale Vredestein. While this group had a back-and-forth battle throughout the week with the leader jerseys changing shoulders four times, Platt and Sahm ultimately won, wearing their yellow leaders' jerseys on the final stage into Lourensford Wine Estate.

2008
Roel Paulissen and Jakob Fuglsang returned and delivered a strong performance early on as the Bulls suffered. Though Cannondal Vredestein experienced tyre problems near Bredasdorp, they ultimately prevailed.

2009
The songo.info team, consisting of Burry Stander (from South Africa) and Cristoph Sauser (from Switzerland), won the first several stages but their hopes were dashed when Stander's front wheel was smashed. Ultimately the Bulls of Platt and Sahm won the competition.

2010
The Bulls entered the race as favorites, though Team MTN Qhubeka's Kevin Evans and Alban Lakata took the lead after Stage 1. As the race wore on, however, MTN Qhubeka experienced tyre failures and Stander won three stages—enough to push the Bulls over the finish line in first place.

2011
Burry Stander and Cristoph Sauser won 5 of 7 days, making Stander the first South African to win the Absa Cape Epic.

2012
Stander and Sauser again turned in a winning performance, beating team 360Life (Kevin Evans and David George) by almost 30 minutes.

2013
Team Burry Stander-Songo, Christoph Sauser and Jaroslav Kulhavý, won the 2013 Absa Cape Epic by 7:10. With this fourth win, Christoph Sauser tied Karl Platt for the most Absa Cape Epic victories. In second place in an overall time of 29:47.55,3 were Team Bulls' Karl Platt and new partner Urs Huber, followed by teammates Thomas Dietsch and Tim Boehme with a time of 30:07.35,9.

2014
Topeak Ergon's Kristian Hynek (Czech republic) and Robert Mennen (Germany) emerged as overall winners after a dramatic event in which the lead changed several times. Pre-race favourites Karl Platt (Germany) and Urs Huber (Switzerland) of the Bulls team pulled out on Stage 4 after the German, bidding for his fifth win, injured his knee in a crash. Switzerland's Christoph Sauser, also seeking to be the first to win five times, and his Czech partner Frantisek Rabon finished second after a race plagued by mechanical problems and punctures. The women's event was comfortably won by Ariane Lüthi (Switzerland) and Annika Langvad (Denmark) after they overcame a poor Stage 1 in which they too were plagued by punctures.

2015
Christoph Sauser because the first person to win the Absa Cape Epic five times after finishing with his partner Jaroslav Kulhavý. Defending champions Ariane Lüthi and Annika Langvad won the Women's category by more than an hour.

2016
Karl Platt of Germany manages to equal Christoph Sauser with his fifth Absa Cape Epic win when he sails to victory with racing partner Urs Huber as Team Bulls. Ariane Lüthi and Annika Langvad take home the women's trophy once again with a third consecutive win. The Women's category rule change ensuring that women started in a separate batch to the men made for exciting racing with Yana Belomoyna and Sabine Spitz claiming three stage wins from the reigning champions.

2017
The Swiss duo of Nino Schurter and Matthais Stirnemann (SCOTT-SRAM MTB Racing) were first time winners of the men's race after taking over the yellow zebra jersey on Stage 6 while Esther Süss and Jennie Stenerhag of Meerendal CBC claimed the Hansgrohe Women's category after taking the orange jersey at the end of Stage 1 and wearing it for the balance of the race.

2018
Jaroslav Kulhavy earned his third win on the men's side, partnering with American Howard Grotts as team Investec Songo Specialized. Annika Langvad and American newcomer Kate Courtney, also team Investec Songo Specialized, won every stage save one and won the overall event by 46 minutes.

Organisation
The holding company of the Absa Cape Epic brand is named Cape Epic Pty Ltd and this events team is responsible for all that is required for a full service mountain bike stage race, including route design, logistics, planning and implementation.

Logistics
After each stage riders arrive at the finish to a full-service race village. The forward planning begins up to two years before the race. Finding a location for a race village involves complex planning for space, water, electricity access and other amenities. The entire race village moves from one location to another. Typically each location is used for two nights. 1 300 fully supported riders start the event, the vast majority eating and sleeping within the village - most in one-man tents supplied by the organisers, others in camper vans which they can hire. Ablution and medical facilities are provided. The bikes require attention too, with a free cleaning service and mechanics on hand. The Absa Cape Epic crew of more than 1 000 also stay in the race village. Besides these, media representatives from TV, digital and print need to be accommodated.

There are several areas of speciality required to run the event:

Medics
The Mediclinic race hospital is equipped to handle any medical emergency, either at the village or out on the course. A UCI anti-doping official and an anti-doping caravan also accompany the medical team.

Route marshals
A team of thirty trained marshals not only show riders the way, but ensure the safety of cyclists. The marshals are trained in first-aid, with a number having more advanced medical training.

Showers
Shower trailers are available throughout the race, with the units being towed between the various stages to await the riders.

Pro tech zones
These are situated at all waterpoints. They are for the use of UCI-registered riders only. The organisers will transport one wheel set and one tool bag per two-rider team to each of the zones for every stage. The content of the tool bag is at the team's discretion and may consist of anything riders wish to use – tools, spares, tyre sealant, food, waterbottles, sunscreen. No technical or mechanical assistance is provided and teams may only access their own boxes and wheelsets.

Tech zones
These are provided for amateur riders, with a mechanic present to aid them with their repairs.

Prize money
In 2014 the Absa Cape Epic matched the women's prize purse to the men's prize purse for the first time. The increase to R700 000 for the women's category took the total prize purse for all categories to R1 600 000.

At the time this was the highest prize purse for women's cycling globally, including road races.

Alan Cameron, MD of Sasol Oil: "We’re delighted to be sponsoring the legendary Absa Cape Epic. This gruelling race demands exceptional performance from all riders, regardless of their gender. We believe the prize money should reflect this and we’re therefore proud to be increasing the women’s prize to equal that of the men".

In the media
The Absa Cape Epic is the most televised mountain bike race in the world. With more than 25 000 hours global television broadcast in 22 languages to 175 countries since 2004, including UK, USA, Germany, Italy, France, Spain, Czech Republic, Japan, Brazil, Egypt and Rwanda. Viewers tune in to watch news clips, highlights packages and an hour-long program worldwide. Photographs and articles about the event have appeared in The New York Times the LA Times, Sports Illustrated, as well as dozens of international and local bicycle magazines and websites.

Exxaro Academy
Exxaro is the Development Academy Partner to the Absa Cape Epic and sponsor of the Exxaro Academy. The goal of the Exxaro Academy is to introduce the mountain biking experience to historically disadvantaged communities and individuals, and ultimately assist to transform the sport in South Africa. Additionally, Exxaro Academy riders and all other Historically Disadvantaged South African riders under the age of 26 are eligible to be awarded the Exxaro Special Jersey during the Absa Cape Epic.

Doping
In December 2012 the Absa Cape Epic introduced a lifetime ban for all athletes found guilty of a doping offence.

Cyclist David George tested positive for a banned substance and was subsequently given a two-year ban from all competitive cycling. SAIDS indicated that only results dating back to 29 August 2012 - when its test was carried out - could be erased. Riding with Kevin Evans, he had finished second in the 2012 Absa Cape Epic which took place in March and the result therefore stood.

Kevin Vermaak, founder of the race, said at the time: "As of 1 January 2013, any athlete (professional or amateur) caught using performance-enhancing substances, whether at another event or out of competition, will be banned for life from participating in the Absa Cape Epic. Not only will the person not be allowed to participate (as an amateur rider or UCI- licensed elite), but the individual will also be banned from being involved on any level, including as a team manager. This is harsher than what is required currently by any federation, but is our considered opinion of what should be enforced even on a wider scale with regards to event participation of convicted dope cheats".

Vermaak continued: "We've chosen not to apply this retrospectively because we believe that would be naive. As has been exposed in recent months, cycling has a dark past. Many riders from this previous era have rediscovered the joy of cycling as mountain bikers and participate in the Absa Cape Epic as their expression of riding clean. Previous offenders, who have served their suspension term, may ride future Absa Cape Epics. We want to be part of the new era of cleaner cycling, and therefore only future offenders will receive the lifetime bans".

Subsequent to this decision several riders have been banned from riding in the Absa Cape Epic for life.

In spite of extensive testing there have, however, been only two positive in-competition doping tests at the Absa Cape Epic. Both were amateur riders.

Statistics
Three teams have won more than one Absa Cape Epic – Karl Platt and Stefan Sahm of Team Bulls, Christoph Sauser and Burry Stander of 36One-Songo-Specialized and Christoph Sauser again with Jaroslav Kulhavy in Team Burry Stander-SONGO and Investec-Songo-Specialized respectively. Christoph Sauser and Karl Platt are the only riders to have won the race five times. There are four riders who have completed all 16 editions of the Absa Cape Epic, with only one woman on that exclusive list, Hannele Steyn of South Africa.
Karl Platt, Mannie Heymans, Bart Brentjens, Roel Paulissen, Jaroslav Kulhavy, Stefan Sahm and Howard Grotts all won the Absa Cape Epic the first time they rode the race. The Absa Cape Epic has been won five times by teams who led the general classification from the first stage and holding the lead all the way to the finish. Karl Platt and Mannie Heymans did it during the first edition, 2004. Bart Brentjens and Roel Paulissen repeated the feat the next year and Christoph Sauser and Burry Stander in both 2011 and 2012, followed by Karl Platt and Urs Huber in 2016.
There is one team that has won the Absa Cape Epic Women's category twice – the partnership of Sharon Laws (GBR) and Hanlie Booyens (RSA). The only women's team to win the category three times are Ariane Lüthi (SUI) with partner Annika Langvad (DEN).

References

External links
 

 
Cape Epic